Padubidri or Padubidre or Padubedre in Tulu language is a small town in coastal district of Udupi in Karnataka state, India.

Padubidri is on the way from Udupi to Mangalore route. National Highway 17 (now NH 66) passes through Padubidri. Padubidri is famous for ritual Dakkebali, which is held every two years. This ritual is held in odd series of years 2005, 2007 and so on. The Nandikoor thermal power plant also known as Udupi thermal power plant is nearby.

Ethnicity
Padubidri has a large Tuluva ethnic group followed by Kannadiga, Konkanis, Beary and  Urdu population.

Transportation
All buses ply to [Padubidri] from Mangalore to Udupi and Karkala, connecting the three major cities en route to Padubidri. The nearest airport is at Bajpe, which is a 45-minute drive away. There is a railway station at Padubidri on Konkan Railway route but actually it is bit away from Padubidre town at Paniyoor, Nandikoor is the nearest railway station.

Places of interest
Mahalingeshwara Mahaganapathi Temple
Padubidri Brahmasthana
Muhiyuddin Jumma Masjid Padubidri
Padubidri Bala Ganapathi Temple
Sri Subramanya Temple, Santhuru
Padubidri Blue Flag Beach
Nandikoor Thermal Power Plant
Sri Venkataramana Temple
Santhoor Subramanya Temple

References

External links
Places of interest
Padubidri Beach Website
Information

Cities and towns in Udupi district